Claude Cholat was a French painter. He created the painting La Prise de la Bastille (Siege of the Bastille) after the storming of the Bastille in 1789. During the storming, he operated a cannon and fought for the National Guard.

References

18th-century French painters
French male painters
People of the French Revolution
Wine merchants
Year of birth unknown
Year of death unknown
18th-century French businesspeople
18th-century French male artists